The 2018 North Carolina Tar Heels men's soccer team represented the University of North Carolina at Chapel Hill during the 2018 NCAA Division I men's soccer season. It was the 72nd season of the university fielding a program.

The 2018 season saw North Carolina win the inaugural U.S. Soccer Spring Men's College Program.

Fetzer Field was undergoing construction during the 2018 soccer season so the Tar Heels split their home matches between three stadiums:WakeMed Soccer Park, Bryan Park, and Koskinen Stadium.

Background

The 2017 North Carolina men's soccer team finished the season with a 17–4–1 overall record and a 6–1–1 ACC record.  The Tar Heels were seeded second–overall in the 2017 ACC Men's Soccer Tournament.  The Tar Heels were upset in the Quarterfinals by the seventh seed Notre Dame.  The Tar Heels earned an at-large bid into the 2017 NCAA Division I Men's Soccer Tournament.  As the third-overall seed in the tournament, the Tar Heels defeated, UNC Wilmington, SMU, and Fordham before losing to Indiana in the College Cup.

At the end of the season, one Tar Heels men's soccer player was selected in the 2018 MLS SuperDraft: Alan Winn.

Player movement

Departures

Incoming transfers

2018 recruiting class

Squad

Roster 

Updated August 6, 2018

Team management

Schedule

Source:

|-
!colspan=8 style=""| Exhibition

|-
!colspan=7 style=""| Regular season

|-
!colspan=7 style=""| ACC Tournament

|-
!colspan=6 style=""| NCAA Tournament

Awards and honors

2019 MLS Super Draft

Source:

Rankings

References

External links 
UNC Soccer

North Carolina Tar Heels men's soccer seasons
North Carolina Tar Heels
2018 in sports in North Carolina
North Carolina Tar Heels
North Carolina